Daughters of Charity refers to:
 Daughters of Charity of Saint Vincent de Paul
 Daughters of Charity of the Sacred Heart of Jesus
 Canossians, "Canossian Daughters of Charity, Servants of the Poor"
 Daughters of Charity of the Most Precious Blood

See also
 Daughters of Divine Charity
 Missionaries of Charity
 Sisters of Charity